Magnetic Soccer is a European-exclusive Game Boy video game that was released in 1992; the concept of the game is based on the board game of tabletop football.

Gameplay

Each team has eight players (one goalkeeper, two attackers/defenders, and three midfielders). When the player moves a row, all of them are moved at once unlike on an actual table soccer set. Rows cannot be moved in an upward or a downward position; only from left to right. Stopping the ball and performing powerful shots is only one aspect of the game. Players can also incapacitate one of the opposing players on a well-timed shot. A tied game results in a penalty shootout.

Three different surfaces are available. Players can practice without a computer opponent and a spectator mode allows newcomers to see two computer-controller opponents face off.

Reception
The German computer and video games magazine Power Play gave Magnetic Soccer an overall rating of 57% in their December 1992 review.

References

1992 video games
Association football video games
Europe-exclusive video games
Game Boy-only games
Multiplayer and single-player video games
Game Boy games
Video games based on board games
Video games developed in Japan